Ancistroides folus, the grass demon, is a small but prominent butterfly found in India & Nepal that belongs to the skipper family, Hesperiidae. It is regarded as an occasional pest of ginger and turmeric plants.

Description

It is a small butterfly with a wingspan of about 4 to 4.8 cm. It is black with a large white spot on the upperside of the hindwing and several smaller whites spots on the forewing. The underside of its wings is mostly white with brown edges and spots.

Range
Sri Lanka, India, Nepal and onto Myanmar, China, India, Indochina, Taiwan, Japan, Thailand, Malaysian Peninsula, Singapore, Borneo, Indonesia

Status
Not rare in India. Rare or very rare in certain parts of its global range. This butterfly is seen chiefly during the monsoon, perhaps due to its larval host plants growing at this time of the year.

Habitat
The grass demon is to be found in deciduous and semi-evergreen forests. It prefers the edges of open spaces rather than the deep forest shade or open sunlight. It is most abundant in the more open regions of hilly jungle. It is also encountered on the plains at some distance from such terrain.

Habits
The grass demon prefers forest edges or clearings where dappled light is present. Its black and white colouration may have evolved to take advantage of the dappled light in these areas. The pied pattern which seems prominent in the open is effectively disruptive in the shade and the butterfly is difficult to locate once it settles down.

It is a bold insect and not easily disturbed. It usually flies in the shade among bushes and under trees keeping low and close to the ground. From time to time, it takes short flights, and, occasionally, much longer excursions into the open clearings. Its flight is quick and the path is very erratic making it very difficult to track when in flight.

When basking it sits on the upperside of leaves of herbs or bushes with its hindwings pressed flat against the surface and its forewings held half open at an angle above the hindwings.

This butterfly also has a unique wing flashing display most often seen just after it has alighted on a leaf. It will move its hindwings down toward the leaf surface. When the hindwings are about halfway down the forewings also start moving downwards. On the upward beat both wings are moved simultaneously till the hindwings come together. Then it again begins the downward beat. Each beat is performed very slowly and the butterfly is very conspicuous during this time.

This display is unique since no other peninsular Indian butterfly is known to display the capability of moving forewings and hindwings separately.

The grass demon is a nectar lover and has a long proboscis compared to body size. This makes it easy to get to nectar of flowers with long corolla tubes. In gardens, the common periwinkle (Vinca rosea) and Lantana are its favourite flowers. It rarely visits bird or dung droppings. It is fond of water and often seen perched on a stone in a stream-bed.

Life cycle

The butterflies emerge in February or March and lay eggs before they die. The eggs remain dormant till the rains, that is, usually the month of May, when they hatch. The caterpillars pupate in September and October and the adults emerge four to six months later. In some cases the caterpillars pupate later and in these cases the pupa remain dormant, throughout the dry season, till May when the rains begin.

Eggs
The female normally sits on the underside of the leaf of the host plant and lays a single egg. The egg is reddish and appears smooth and dome shaped. When about to hatch it turns white with a red top.

Larva

Soon after hatching, the caterpillar does not consume the eggshell completely and it makes itself a spacious cell and hides inside it. The caterpillar is sluggish and comes out to feed only at night. Even when disturbed it is reluctant to leave its cell.

The caterpillar is a light uniform leaf green colour with a dark green pulsating line on the back and a relatively small, dark head. The full grown larva has the habit of resting with the first three segments contracted, so as to give a humped appearance. It always lies closely applied to the leaf, by turning over a triangular piece from the edge onto the upper surface over itself. Specific host plants include Zingiber zerumbet.

Pupa

Pupation takes place on the same plant within a cell. The pupa is long and cylindrical, watery green in colour. It has a long conical projection in front of the head. The eyes are easily seen but do not protrude out of the outline of the pupa. The pupa broadens towards the shoulders and the abdomen gradually tapers to the last segment.

The most striking characteristic of the pupa is its proboscis. It is long and thin generally extending up to and a little beyond the tip of the abdomen. The pupa is the same colour of the caterpillar and unmarked. It is covered in a thin layer of white powder. The body band is neither too tight nor too loose and allows the pupa to wriggle if disturbed.

Food plants
The grass demon feeds on ginger, turmeric, and their relatives Curcuma aromatica, Curcuma decipiens, Hedychium sp. and other plants of family Sctiaminae. It has also been recorded on Zingiber sp. and on grasses.

References

Ancistroidini
Butterflies of Asia
Butterflies described in 1775
Butterflies of Singapore
Butterflies of Indochina
Taxa named by Pieter Cramer